Church Secrets & Legends is an American documentary television series that premiered on Sunday, March 16, 2014, on the Travel Channel. The series features the secrets and legends hidden in the many churches, cathedrals and chapels, as well as other houses of worship all over the world. The first season episodes air every Sunday at 10:00 pm EST.

Premise
Each episode includes dramatic recreations featuring actors re-telling the most mysterious, secret and strange stories and legends from a church's holy and not-so-holy history that the pastors or priests do not want their parishioners to find out. These stories have either have occurred inside the church or near the world's most famous and even not-so-famous churches.

Opening Introduction: (narrated by Dave B. Mitchell):

Series overview

Episodes

Season 1 (2014)

References

External links
 
 
 Church Secrets & Legends @ TV.com
 

2010s American documentary television series
2014 American television series debuts
English-language television shows
Travel Channel original programming